is a Latin term for an argument or other discussion that has continued to the point of nausea. For example, "this has been discussed " indicates that the topic has been discussed extensively and those involved have grown sick of it.  The fallacy of dragging the conversation to an ad nauseam state in order to then assert one's position as correct due to it not having been contradicted is also called  (to infinity) and argument from repetition.

The term is defined by the American Heritage Dictionary as "to a disgusting or ridiculous degree; to the point of nausea." Colloquially, it is sometimes used as "until nobody cares to discuss it any more."

See also
Ad libitum
Big lie
Carthago delenda est
Filibuster
Godwin's law
Sealioning
Thought-terminating cliché
List of Latin phrases

References

External links

Latin logical phrases
Latin words and phrases